Clermont is a township of Durban in KwaZulu-Natal, South Africa.

Clermont under the apartheid days was a black middle income township. Its immediate surroundings include KwaDabeka to the north, New Germany to the west, Westville to the south and Reservoir Hills to the east. Its main road is called Clermont road and is named after Sir Clermont, a farmer who sold his land. It was the only place in Durban where black people were able to buy property and build houses. Since the end of apartheid Clermont has been sprawling with shacks as people from the rural areas come and seek work opportunities in the nearby suburbs of Westville and New Germany, Pinetown and Durban.

Clermont has a large FM St.John Apostolic Faith Mission, Anglican, Catholic and Wesleyan Church community and on Sundays one can see the women of each denomination wearing their church uniforms with pride.

Notable residents
 Nonkululeko Nyembezi-Heita - business executive in steel, former director of ArcelorMittal South Africa telecommunications and finance. Since March 2014, she has been CEO of the Dutch mining group, IchorCoal N.V., board chairperson of Alexander Forbes Group Holdings
 Baleka Mbete - Speaker of the National Assembly of South Africa from May 2014 to May 2019
 Eric Mtshali - Anti-Apartheid activist, former Member of Parliament of South Africa & former South African Communist Party National Executive Committee member
 Muzi Mthabela - Actor, famously known for playing the role of Duma on Isibaya
 Msawawa - Kwaito artist, songwriter, and businessman
 Phumzile Mlambo-Ngcuka - Deputy President of South Africa from 2005 to 2008,  Executive Director of UN Women with the rank of Under-Secretary-General of the United Nations

References 
 Municipal Demarcation Board
Community Justice in a Volatile South Africa: Containing Community Conflict, Clermont, Natal by Daniel Nina (Social Justice 20 (3-4) (Fall-Winter 1993): 129-42)

External links
eThekwini Online The official site of Durban, South Africa

Populated places in eThekwini Metropolitan Municipality
Townships in KwaZulu-Natal